José De La Torre (born October 17, 1985) is a Puerto Rican former professional baseball pitcher. He played in Major League Baseball (MLB) for the Boston Red Sox.

Career
De La Torre attended Dr. Pedro Albizu Campos High School in Toa Baja, Puerto Rico. He then attended Texarkana College in Texarkana, Texas.

New York Mets
De La Torre signed with the New York Mets organization in 2006.

Cleveland Indians
He signed with the Cleveland Indians as a minor league free agent before the 2012 season.

Boston Red Sox
The Indians traded De La Torre to the Boston Red Sox for Brent Lillibridge during the 2012 season.

The Red Sox invited De La Torre to spring training as a non-roster invitee in 2013. De La Torre was named to the Puerto Rico national baseball team for the 2013 World Baseball Classic. De La Torre's contract was purchased from Triple-A Pawtucket on May 9, 2013, to help with a battered bullpen after Joel Hanrahan was placed on the 60-day disabled list. It was De La Torre's first call-up to the majors. He made two appearances before being optioned back to Pawtucket on May 20 when Andrew Bailey returned to the Red Sox from the disabled list. He was recalled on June 11 when Clayton Mortensen went on the disabled list, and sent back down on June 12. He was recalled again on July 5 when Stephen Drew went on the disabled list. He was designated for assignment on September 10, 2013.

Milwaukee Brewers
He was claimed off waivers by the Milwaukee Brewers on September 13, 2013. He elected free agency on November 6, 2015.

Pirates De Campeche
He signed with the Piratas de Campeche of the Mexican Baseball League for the 2016 season. He became a free agent after the 2017 season.

See also
 List of Major League Baseball players from Puerto Rico

References

External links

1985 births
Living people
Akron Aeros players
Binghamton Mets players
Boston Red Sox players
Brevard County Manatees players
Brooklyn Cyclones players
Buffalo Bisons (minor league) players
Criollos de Caguas players
Columbus Clippers players
Gulf Coast Mets players
Huntsville Stars players
Kingsport Mets players
Liga de Béisbol Profesional Roberto Clemente pitchers
Louisville Bats players
Major League Baseball pitchers
Major League Baseball players from Puerto Rico
Mexican League baseball pitchers
Nashville Sounds players
Pawtucket Red Sox players
Piratas de Campeche players
Puerto Rican expatriate baseball players in Mexico
Sportspeople from San Juan, Puerto Rico
Somerset Patriots players
St. Lucie Mets players
Texarkana Bulldogs baseball players
Waikiki Beach Boys players
2013 World Baseball Classic players
2017 World Baseball Classic players